Sulików may refer to:

Sulików, Lower Silesian Voivodeship (south-west Poland)
Sulików, Świętokrzyskie Voivodeship (south-central Poland)